Rhopalizus is a genus of round-necked longhorn beetles of the subfamily Cerambycinae.

Species
 Rhopalizus chlorolineatus Quedenfeldt, 1882 
 Rhopalizus dorsalis Hintz, 1919 
 Rhopalizus euporidus Jordan, 1894 
 Rhopalizus femoralis Hintz, 1919 
 Rhopalizus laetus Lameere, 1893 
 Rhopalizus laevicollis Hintz, 1916 
 Rhopalizus nitens (Fabricius, 1781) 
 Rhopalizus schweinfurthi Schmidt, 1922

References
 Biolib

Callichromatini